The Sex and Love Tour was the tenth headlining concert tour by the Spanish recording artist Enrique Iglesias. The tour supported his tenth studio album, Sex and Love (2014). Beginning in February 2014, Iglesias performed in the Americas, Asia, Africa, and Europe. The singer embarked on a separate co-headling tour with Pitbull for shows in the United States and Canada.

Opening acts
Demi Lovato (Europe, select dates)
David Vendetta 
Juan Magan 
Dalí 
Pitbull (Lima)
J Balvin (Lima)
Joey Montana (Lima)
Prince Royce (Lima)
Gente De Zona (Quito)

Setlist 
The following setlist was obtained from the concert held on July 3, 2015 at the Auditorio Nacional in Mexico City, Mexico. It does not represent all concerts for the duration of the tour. 
"Tonight (I'm Lovin' You)"
"I Like How It Feels"
"No Me Digas Que No"
"Bailamos"
"El Perdedor"
"Loco"
"Cuando Me Enamoro"
"Be With You"
"Tired of Being Sorry"
"Escape"
"Hero"
"Experiencia Religiosa"
"El Perdón"
"Bailando"
"I Like It"

Tour dates

Festivals and other miscellaneous performances

This concert was a part of "El Concierto de los Enamorados"
This concert was a part of the "Festival de la Leyenda Vallenata"
This concert was a part of the "Feria de Cali"
This concert was a part of the "Metroconcierto Histórico"
This concert was a part of the "Brahva Summer Fest"
This concert was a part of the "Starlite Festival"
This concert was a part of the "Monte-Carlo Sporting Summer Festival"
This concert was a part of the "Ehdeniyat International Festival"
This concert was a part of the "Curaçao North Sea Jazz Festival"
This concert was a part of the "Mexican Independence Day Celebration"
This concert was a part of "L Festival"
This concert was a part of "Fiestas de Cuenca"
This concert was a part of the "Festival Nacional de Peñas de Villa María"
This concert was a part of "Yasalam After-Race Concerts"
This concert was a part of the "McAllen Holiday Parade"
This concert was a part of "Starlite México"
This concert was a part of "KTUphoria"
This concert was a part of the "Formula 1 Grand Prix Event"
This concert was a part of the "Aruba Summer Music Festival"
This concert was a part of the "Casino Del Sol Anniversary Weekend"
This concert was a part of "Expo 2016"
This concert was a part of the "Dubai International Jazz Festival"
This concert was a part of the "2017 Bahrain Grand Prix"
This concert was a part of "Expo Fiesta Michoacán"

Box office score data

References

Enrique Iglesias concert tours
2014 concert tours
2015 concert tours
2016 concert tours
2017 concert tours